The Roman Catholic Church in Croatia is composed of four ecclesiastical provinces, 12 suffragan dioceses, one military ordinariate and one diocese immediately subject to the Holy See .

List of Dioceses

Ecclesiastical Province of Rijeka
Archdiocese of Rijeka 
Diocese of Gospić–Senj 
Diocese of Krk
Diocese of Poreč i Pula

Ecclesiastical Province of Đakovo-Osijek
Roman Catholic Archdiocese of Đakovo-Osijek
Diocese of Požega
Diocese of Syrmia

Ecclesiastical Province of Split-Makarska
Archdiocese of Split-Makarska 
Diocese of Dubrovnik 
Diocese of Hvar
Diocese of Šibenik

Ecclesiastical Province of Zagreb
Archdiocese of Zagreb 
Diocese of Bjelovar-Križevci
Eparchy of Križevci
Diocese of Sisak
Diocese of Varaždin

Immediately subject to the Holy See

Archdiocese of Zadar

Sui iuris Jurisdictions

Military Ordinariate of Croatia

External links 
Catholic-Hierarchy entry 
GCatholic.org.

Croatia
Catholic Dioceses